George Kinek (January 13, 1929 – January 21, 1995) was an American football end.

Early life and education
Kinek was born in Palmerton, Pennsylvania. He attended Allentown Central Catholic High School and then Tulane University.

Career
He played for the Chicago Cardinals in 1954.

Death
He died on January 21, 1995, in Salisbury Township, Pennsylvania at age 67.

References

1929 births
1995 deaths
Allentown Central Catholic High School alumni
American football ends
Tulane Green Wave football players
Chicago Cardinals players